The Ministry of Communication and Information Technology was an Indian government ministry. It was bifurcated into Ministry of Communications and Ministry of Electronics and Information Technology in July 2016. It contained three departments viz. Department of Telecommunications, Department of Electronics and Information Technology (DeitY, now Ministry of Electronics and Information Technology) and Department of Posts.

The following cadre controlling authority of the Civil Services (including Indian Telecommunication Service, Indian Postal Service, Indian Radio Regulatory Service, Telegraph Traffic Service, Indian Post & Telegraph Building Works Services and Indian Posts and Telegraphs Accounts and Finance Service) are under the administration and supervision of the Ministry of Communications and Information Technology.

List of Ministers
Following is the list of Ministers of Communications.

References

External links 
 

 
India
National Informatics Centre
Defunct government ministries of India